is a passenger railway station located in the city of Seiyo, Ehime Prefecture, Japan. It is operated by JR Shikoku and has the station number "U23".

Lines
Only local trains serve the station. Connections with other services are needed to travel further east of Matsuyama on the line.

Layout
The station, which is unstaffed, consists of two opposed side platforms serving two tracks. A small station building serves as a waiting room. Access to the opposite platform is by means of ramps and a level crossing. A bike shed is provided nearby.

History
The Uwajima Line and its stations, including Shimo-uwa, then became part of the Yosan Mainline from that date. At that time, the station was operated by Japanese Government Railways (JGR), later becoming Japanese National Railways (JNR). With the privatization of JNR on 1 April 1987, control of the station passed to JR Shikoku.

Surrounding area
 Hoketsu Pass 
 Seiyo City Minata Elementary School

See also
 List of railway stations in Japan

References

External links
Station timetable

Railway stations in Ehime Prefecture
Railway stations in Japan opened in 1941
Seiyo, Ehime